Sinocyclocheilus aquihornes is a species of cyprinid fish in the genus Sinocyclocheilus.

References 

aquihornes
Fish described in 2007